Walter Daniel Powell (July 15, 1891 – September 15, 1967) was an American football player and coach of football, basketball, and baseball.

Powell was born in Reedsburg, Wisconsin.  He played college football at the University of Wisconsin from 1912 to 1913. He coached several sports at Western Reserve University from 1914 to 1917, amassing an overall 14–15 record in football, 18–24 record in basketball, and a 5–3 record in baseball.

In 1917, Powell served as athletic director at Camp Sherman.  From 1917 to 1919, he served as head coach of the Naval Training Station in Charleston, South Carolina.

Powell coached one season at the Montana College of Agriculture and Mechanic Arts—now known as Montana State University, from 1919 to 1920, where his football record was 1–3–1 and his basketball record was a perfect 13–0. From 1920 to 1921, Powell coached Stanford University's football and basketball teams, where he compiled a football record of 4–3 and a basketball record of 15–3.

Powell later moved to Atlanta and went into business. He was also a football official for the Southeastern Conference (SEC) and officiated a number of Rose Bowls. Powell died on September 15, 1967, at a hospital in Gastonia, North Carolina.

Head coaching record

Football

References

External links
 

1891 births
1967 deaths
College football officials
Case Western Spartans baseball coaches
Case Western Spartans football coaches
Case Western Spartans men's basketball coaches
Montana State Bobcats football coaches
Montana State Bobcats men's basketball coaches
Stanford Cardinal football coaches
Stanford Cardinal men's basketball coaches
People from Reedsburg, Wisconsin
Coaches of American football from Wisconsin
Players of American football from Wisconsin
Basketball coaches from Wisconsin